Francis Joseph Tief (March 7, 1881 – September 22, 1965) was an American prelate of the Catholic Church. He served as bishop of the Diocese of Concordia in Kansas from 1921 to 1938.

Biography

Early life 
Francis Tief was born on March 7, 1881, in Port Chester, New York, to John and Catherine (née Glynn) Tief,  both from Ireland. After studying at Niagara University in Lewiston, New York for one year, he attended St. Bonaventure College in Allegany, New York, obtaining his Bachelor of Arts degree in 1905. 

Tief was ordained to the priesthood by Bishop Charles H. Colton on June 13, 1908. He briefly served as a curate at Our Lady of Lourdes Parish in New York City before becoming the first resident pastor of Sacred Heart Parish in Webb City, Missouri. In 1910, he became rector of the Cathedral of the Immaculate Conception in Kansas City, and was named vicar general of the Diocese of Kansas City in 1916.

Bishop of Concordia 
On December 16, 1920, Tief was appointed the third bishop of the Diocese of Concordia by Pope Benedict XV. He received his episcopal consecration on March 30, 1921, from Bishop Thomas Lillis, with Bishops Peter Muldoon and John Tihen serving as co-consecrators. He was installed at the Cathedral of Our Lady of Perpetual Help in Concordia on the following April 6. During his tenure, Tief built or renovated eight churches, eight rectories, six schools, two convents, an elderly home, the Home of the Little Flower in Concordia (1924), St. Mary's Hospital in Manhattan, Kansas (1936), St. Joseph's College and Military Academy in Hays, Kansas (1931), and Marymount College in Salina, Kansas (1922). He ordained 28 priests, built a new episcopal residence and chancery in Concordia (1926–1927), and established the Northwestern Kansas Register as the diocesan newspaper in 1937. Tief also pioneered the religious vacation school movement which officially began in 1927.

Retirement and legacy 
On June 11, 1938, Pope Pius XI accepted Tief's resignation due to poor health as bishop of Concordia and named him Titular Bishop of Nisa in Lycia. He retired to Port Chester, where he served as pastor of Sacred Heart Parish.  Francis Tief died in Port Chester on September 22, 1965, at age 84.

References

1881 births
1965 deaths
Niagara University alumni
St. Bonaventure University alumni
People from Port Chester, New York
American Roman Catholic clergy of Irish descent
Roman Catholic bishops of Concordia
20th-century Roman Catholic bishops in the United States